New Model Degree College (NMDC) is a non-government masters level college in Dhanmondi, Dhaka, Bangladesh.

Background 
The enterprise of Noakhali  Shanti established the New Model Degree College in 1969. At first NMDC established in the Green road at the beginning. After the war of 1971, the college was replaced  to Dhanmondi. Road -8 and house number 500. But it was damaged for war. For the outstanding performance of this college in public examination in the year 1978. For that government has given a piece of land of one bigha at the opposite site of Dhanmondi road -32. Now present new model degree college.

Department 
NMDC provides both HSC and Graduation level education such as BA Honors, Masters, BBA and MBA. Also it has management, finance, accounting, marketing and social work department for the graduation level students. Also HSC level including humanities, business studies and science.

References

Universities and colleges in Bangladesh